Qilan Forest Recreation Area is a forest located in Datong Township, Yilan County, Taiwan.

Architecture
The forest consists of villa used by former President Chiang Kai-shek, walking trails etc. It was constructed with European-style architecture. It also consists of hotel rooms and wood cottages, as well as a restaurant.

Ecology
The forests consists of Taiwan's largest giant tree cluster. It also consists of cherry and peaches blossom area.

Transportation
The forest is accessible by bus from Yilan Station or Luodong Station.

See also
 Geography of Taiwan

References

Forests of Taiwan
Geography of Yilan County, Taiwan
Tourist attractions in Yilan County, Taiwan